The Royal Chapel of Granada is an Isabelline style building, constructed between 1505 and 1517, and originally integrated in the complex of the neighbouring Granada Cathedral. It is the burial place of the Spanish monarchs, Queen Isabella I and King Ferdinand, the Catholic Monarchs. Apart from these historical links, this building also contains a gallery of artworks and other items associated with Queen Isabella.

History 

The Nasrid dynasty of Granada was the last Moorish dominion of Al-Andalus to fall in the Reconquista (Reconquest). This occurred in 1492 during the reign of the Catholic Monarchs, with the conquest of the city being an important stage of their combined reign. On September 13, 1504, they declared that they wanted their remains to be taken to Granada, and to this effect a royal charter was issued at Medina del Campo, Castile-León, for the Royal Chapel to be built. The charter states:

The Royal Chapel was built between 1505 and 1517 in Isabelline Gothic style and dedicated to St. John the Baptist and St. John the Evangelist, with the construction under the direction of Enrique Egas in Gothic style. Juan Gil de Hontañón, Juan de Badajoz the Elder and Lorenzo Vázquez de Segovia were also involved in the construction project.

The 16th century was the century of the greatest splendour of the Royal Chapel. Construction occurred during the lifetime of King Ferdinand, and the Chapel flourished under his successor Emperor Charles V, with the church decorated, and the supporting institution being enhanced.

The late 18th and early 19th century brought difficulties to the institution. These were linked to political changes, economic difficulties and the profound change in church-state relations. The liberal regime ended with the Patronage regime and the original foundations of the institution becomes a fully ecclesiastical entity.

Some stability was brought about by the Concordat of 1851 which was followed by a Royal decree of reorganization of the Royal Chapels. Isabel II, who visited the Chapel in 1862, promoted a new organization. With the Restoration a new balance is achieved, which is manifested from the years of the fourth centenary of the capitulation of Granada and the discovery of the Americas. As a result of this renewal, this period also witnessed the first scientific publications on the chapel and its art collection.

During the 20th century there was growth in the historical and artistic, archival and musical aspects of the chapel. The museum was created by Royal decree in the year 1913. With the development of the tourist industry in Spain in the second half of 20th century, the Royal Chapel became one of the top tourist attractions of the city of Granada. Recently there has been a restoration with the collaboration of the Ministry of Culture of the Junta de Andalucía and the Foundation Caja Madrid, along with other public and private contributions.

Architecture and sculpture

The interior of the chapel follows the same model as the Monastery of San Juan de los Reyes in Toledo. It has four side chapels, creating the form of a Latin cross and a nave with a Gothic ribbed vault. The choir has a centered arch down to its base, and a crypt.

The passage to the presbytery creates a luminous effect to symbolize the sun and the light of justice (in an Albertian, Neo-Platonic sense). There is a hierarchy of the transept dedicated to mausoleum, which is separated by a monumental decorated grille forged by Bartolomé Ordoñez.

In the center of the transept lie the tombs of Isabella and Ferdinand (sculpted by Domenico Fancelli) and Joanna and Philip (by Bartolomé Ordóñez). The tombs are set high and mark their priority and are almost at the height of the altar (symbolizes the closeness of the kings to God).

Content 

In the Royal Chapel can be seen the graves of:
 Isabella I of Castile, Queen of Castile, and of her husband
 Ferdinand II of Aragon, King of Aragon.

The tomb is by Domenico Fancelli.

In another tomb, work by Bartolomé Ordóñez, are represented:
 Joanna of Castile "the Mad", Queen of Castile and Aragon, and her husband:
 Philip I of Castile "the Handsome", King jure uxoris of Castile; his heart is buried in the Church of Our Lady in Bruges, Belgium.

In the crypt is also the sarcophagus of the  infante Miguel da Paz, Prince of Portugal, grandson of the Catholic Monarchs, who died as a child.

The most important parts inside the temple are its main altar and reredos, the wrought-iron rood screen and the crypt with the five lead coffins containing the remains of kings and the little Infante, each recognizable by the initials of their names. 

The chapel is still dedicated to Catholic worship, and at certain times it is closed to tourists.

One may also visit the Sacristy-Museum, with the legacy of the Catholic Monarchs. Highlights of its gallery of paintings are works of the Flemish, Italian and Spanish schools, with paintings by authors like Juan de Flandes and Hans Memling as well as a rare example by Sandro Botticelli (Agony in the Garden) and other 15th century painters like Rogier van der Weyden, Dirk Bouts, Perugino and Bartolomé Bermejo.  Goldsmiths work on display includes the crown and the scepter of the Catholic Monarchs; tissues and books of the Queen.

In the angle between the Royal Chapel and the Sagrario is the Lonja, constructed in the year 1518 and dedicated to banking and commerce. It has recently been restored and can be visited, both for its architectural interest (the facade, the coffereds) and for the objects displayed inside (paintings, furniture).

Chapel Masters

Since its founding and for centuries, the Royal Chapel had masters who were in charge of the composing of music for liturgical functions, and direction of all matters relating to its interpretation. Between the functions of these musicians also found the education of the voices of the infantillos (or sixes) and care of the archive. To access to charge, applicants had to submit a public competition with ordeals of composition and musical knowledge, the result could only be the granting of the charges to genuine artists. Among the files that make up the music catalog of this institution stand out for their number and their extraordinary chronological extension, the corresponding to the work of Antonio Cavallero, who was appointed to the charge in 1757, replacing Pedro Furió and officially it leaves to die around 1822, closing an interesting relationship of tenured masters.

Other notable chapel masters of the Royal Chapel included:
 Bernardino de Figueroa – later bishop at Brindisi in Italy 1571–1591.
 Rodrigo de Ceballos (1561–1581)
 Ambrosio Cotes (1581–1596)
 Alonso de Mena (1587-1646) born in Granada.

Notes
Spanish Monarchs since Charles V have been buried in the crypt at the Escorial in Castile.
Prior to Isabella I, royal families were buried in diverse cities in the Iberian peninsula.

References

External links

Official website

Roman Catholic churches in Granada
Isabelline architecture
Museums in Granada
Mausoleums in Spain
Burial sites of the House of Trastámara
Royal chapels
Buildings and structures completed in 1517
Religious museums in Spain
Art museums and galleries in Spain
Gothic architecture in Andalusia
Renaissance architecture in Andalusia
Roman Catholic chapels in Spain
Organisations based in Spain with royal patronage

nl:Kathedraal van Granada#Koninklijke Kapel

Rayo Muñoz, G. Castilian monarchy and dynastic memory: the financing of the Royal Chapel of Granada (1504–1526): https://www.tandfonline.com/doi/abs/10.1080/17546559.2021.1972327?journalCode=ribs20